Ninja Express is an animated television series for children aged 6 to 9, created by Kim Claeys and the company Creative Conspiracy, from Ghent; so far, one season of 52 episodes of each 11 minutes has been aired. The series has been bought by TV channels in 192 countries; this show is among the most watched series on CBBC (the children's channel of British broadcaster BBC). The cost of €12 million to create the first season was carried for 50% by Flemish companies and the Flemish Government and for 50% by international partners Entertainment One and WarnerMedia.

The series is about a delivery service run by three ninja's, Aka, Kiro and Konpeki, who have super powers. The show is produced by Entertainment One, Frog Box and Creative Conspiracy.

Ninja Express is shown on CBBC in the UK; Gulli in France; Ketnet in Flanders; and on many international versions of Boomerang (e.g. in Poland, Romania, Germany, Bulgaria and Italy).

Episodes

References

External links
 
 

2020s animated television series
Belgian children's animated comedy television series
2020s French animated television series
2020s British animated television series
2021 French television series debuts
2021 British television series debuts
Television series by Entertainment One
Boomerang (TV network) original programming
CBBC shows
Ketnet original programming